Shadwell is an area of London, England.

Shadwell may also refer to:

Shadwell (name), including a list of people with the name
Shadwell railway station, a station on the London Overground
Shadwell DLR station, a station on the Docklands Light Railway
Shadwell, Gloucestershire, a hamlet of Uley, England
Shadwell, Norfolk, a location in England
Shadwell, Leeds, a village in north east Leeds, West Yorkshire, England
Shadwell, Virginia, a plantation in Virginia, USA
USS Shadwell (LSD-15), United States Ship

See also
Siadwel the Welsh poet (pronounced "Shadwell"), a character from the 1980s BBC sketch show Naked Video
Chadwell (disambiguation)